Sushil Kumar Tiwari ‘Indu Bhaiya’ (born 30 June 1959) is a MLA from Panagar assembly constituency of Madhya Pradesh.

Personal life 

Indu took his initial education from Govindganj Higher Secondary School. Thereafter, he completed B.Com from Mahatma Gandhi Chitrakoot Gramodya University. ‘Indu Bhaiya' is married to Maya Tiwari. They have two sons Aman Tiwari and Harsh Tiwari.

Political career 
Sushil Kumar Tiwari ‘Indu Bhaiya’ has been associated with politics for a long time. After completing his school, he stepped into politics during college life. He played an active role in student politics with the Akhil Bharatiya Vidyarthi Parishad (ABVP) from 1978 to 1985. During this time, he raised many issues and constantly worked for the interests of students. In 1985, he joined the Bharatiya Janata Party (BJP) and continues to work with the party even today. Since 2013, he has done many historical developmental works in the area. He recontested State Legislative Elections from Panagar (Madhya Pradesh) in 2018, and got 84,302 votes and was declared winner and has started his second term as MLA.

Social life 

His most prominent social work is the Netra Jyoti Rath, which helps the financially weak citizens get free treatment for their eyes.

References

1959 births
Living people
Bharatiya Janata Party politicians from Madhya Pradesh